Jitka Senecká (11 January 1940 – 14 December 2012) was a Czech volleyball player. She competed in the women's tournament at the 1968 Summer Olympics.

References

1940 births
2012 deaths
Czech women's volleyball players
Olympic volleyball players of Czechoslovakia
Volleyball players at the 1968 Summer Olympics
Sportspeople from Prague